The Foundation for Relief and Reconciliation in the Middle East (FRRME) aims to rebuild lives and restore hope in the Middle East, engaging with minority communities and the disadvantaged; confronting injustice, mistrust, poverty and exclusion; facilitating open communications through local grassroots partnerships; and delivering practical projects in education, training and healthcare. FRRME is operational in Iraq (Kurdistan and Baghdad) and Jordan.

The Foundation for Relief and Reconciliation in the Middle East (FRRME) is a charity registered in England and Wales

The Foundation for Relief and Reconciliation in the Middle East (FRRME) was the subject of a Charity Enquiry by the Charity Commission into its financial controls.

References

Charities based in the United Kingdom
Foreign charities operating in Iraq